Stage Kisses is a 1927 American silent drama film directed by Albert H. Kelley and starring Kenneth Harlan, Helene Chadwick and Phillips Smalley.

Synopsis
A wealthy man falls in love with an actress and marries her despite the fierce opposition of his mother. Later the mother plots to make it look as if her daughter-in-law is having an affair and break up the couple.

Cast
 Kenneth Harlan as Donald Hampton 
 Helene Chadwick as Fay Leslie 
 John Patrick as Keith Carlin 
 Phillips Smalley as John Clarke 
 Ethel Wales as Mrs. John Clarke 
 Frances Raymond as Mrs. Hampton

References

Bibliography
 Munden, Kenneth White. The American Film Institute Catalog of Motion Pictures Produced in the United States, Part 1. University of California Press, 1997.

External links

1927 films
1927 drama films
Silent American drama films
Films directed by Albert H. Kelley
American silent feature films
1920s English-language films
American black-and-white films
Columbia Pictures films
1920s American films